Sigrist is a surname. Notable people with the surname include:

Mike Sigrist, American Magic: The Gathering player
Shannon Sigrist (born 1999), Swiss ice hockey player

See also
Reid and Sigrist, former English engineering company
Sigerist